Lowenfield v. Phelps, 484 U.S. 231 (1988), is a United States Supreme Court case in which the Court held that the two jury polls and the supplemental charge did not impermissibly coerce the jury to return a death sentence, and that the death sentence does not violate the Eighth Amendment simply because the single statutory "aggravating circumstance" found by the jury duplicates an element of the underlying offense of first-degree murder.

Background 
In 1984, Leslie Lowenfield, a Guyanese immigrant welder, was convicted of the 1982 killing of his girlfriend, a sheriff's deputy, and four members of her family, including a 4-year-old girl.

Opinion of the court 
The court, in an opinion by Chief Justice Rehnquist, held that the trial judge's polling of the jury and supplemental Allen instruction did not coerce the jury to return a verdict of guilty. The Court also rejected a challenge that Louisiana's death penalty statute did not sufficiently narrow the category of defendants who are eligible for the death penalty. The aggravating circumstance in the case, intentionally killing more than one person was found by the jury in the guilt phase after returning 3 first degree murder verdicts.

Subsequent developments 
Lowenfield was executed by electric chair on April 13, 1988, at the age of 34.

See also 
 List of United States Supreme Court cases, volume 484
 List of United States Supreme Court cases
 Lists of United States Supreme Court cases by volume
 List of United States Supreme Court cases by the Rehnquist Court
General:
 Capital punishment in Louisiana
 Capital punishment in the United States
 List of people executed in Louisiana

References

External links
 

United States Supreme Court cases
United States Supreme Court cases of the Rehnquist Court
Allen charge case law
Cruel and Unusual Punishment Clause and death penalty case law
Capital punishment in Louisiana
1988 in United States case law